Sylvia Grace Siddell, Lady Siddell  (1941 – 26 August 2011) was a New Zealand painter, etcher, and screen-printer, based in Auckland.

Education 
Siddell attended the Avondale College (Art teacher: R.N.Field), Auckland Post Primary Teachers' College (1964–65), Auckland University Summer School (1967, tutored by Colin McCahon), night classes at the Auckland Society of Arts (1970, tutored by Louise Henderson), and night classes at the Auckland Technical Institute (1975–76).

Career 
Drawing on the tradition of the European vanitas, or allegorical still life, Siddell's work often depicts inanimate, familiar, and ordinary objects, giving them a sense of vibrancy and reflects on the joys, sorrows, struggles, and frustrations of daily existence. Examples of this include her still life paintings, Fire and Water (2002) and Out of the Frying Pan (2007). Her exhibition Couches, at the Artis Gallery in 2005, is another example of how she instilled life and character into ordinary domestic objects, animating them with a sense of personality.

Exhibitions 
From 1975 onward Siddell exhibited regularly throughout New Zealand and her work is held in private and public collections, both in New Zealand and internationally. Notable exhibitions at the Artis Gallery include Fragments of Life (2000), A Rich Life (1998), and Couches (2005).

In 1994 she took part in the exhibition Unruly Practices at Auckland Art Gallery. The project was a series of solo projects by feminist artists living in Auckland, including work by Carole Shepherd, Claudia Pond Eyley, Mary McIntyre, Christine Hellyar.

Honours and awards
In 1983 Siddell was award the Queen Elizabeth II Arts Council Grant to study printmaking and develop etching, lithography and hand painted screen printing techniques.

In the 2002 Queen's Birthday and Golden Jubilee Honours, Siddell was appointed an Officer of the New Zealand Order of Merit, for services to painting.

Personal life 
In 1960, she married fellow artist Peter Siddell, and had two daughters, Avril and Emily (also an artist).

References

Further reading 
Artist files for Sylvia Grace Siddell are held at:
 Angela Morton Collection, Takapuna Library
 E. H. McCormick Research Library, Auckland Art Gallery Toi o Tāmaki
 Robert and Barbara Stewart Library and Archives, Christchurch Art Gallery Te Puna o Waiwhetu
 Fine Arts Library, University of Auckland
 Macmillan Brown Library, University of Canterbury
Also see:
 Concise Dictionary of New Zealand Artists, McGahey, Kate (2000) Gilt Edge
 Mundane and Marvellous,The Art of Sylvia Siddell (2004) Interactive Education

1941 births
2011 deaths
New Zealand painters
New Zealand women painters
Feminist artists
University of Auckland alumni
Auckland University of Technology alumni
Artists from Auckland
Officers of the New Zealand Order of Merit
People associated with the Museum of New Zealand Te Papa Tongarewa
People associated with the Auckland Society of Arts